Federal elections were held in Switzerland on 26 October 1902. The Free Democratic Party retained its majority in the National Council.

Electoral system
The 167 members of the National Council were elected in 49 single- and multi-member constituencies using a three-round system. Candidates had to receive a majority in the first or second round to be elected; if it went to a third round, only a plurality was required. Voters could cast as many votes as there were seats in their constituency. There was one seat for every 20,000 citizens, with seats allocated to cantons in proportion to their population.

The elections were held under the Federal law concerning the constituencies for the elections of National Council members passed on 4 June 1902, which reduced the number of constituencies from 52 to 49. Following the 1900 census the number of seats was increased from 147 to 167; Zürich gained five seats, Basel-Stadt, Bern, Geneva, St. Gallen and Vaud all gained two seats, whilst Neuchâtel, Solothurn, Ticino, Thurgau and Valais all gained one. A referendum on introducing proportional representation and direct elections for the Federal Council had been held in 1900, but both proposals were rejected by voters.

Results
Voter turnout was highest in Schaffhausen (where voting was compulsory) at 85.8% and lowest in Obwalden at 21.4%.

By constituency

References

1902
Switzerland
Federal
October 1902 events